Cyathophora is a genus of prehistoric stony corals.

 Names brought to synonymy
 †Cyathophora elegans, a synonym for †Holocystis elegans

References 

 Zaman, S. and Lathuilière, B., 2014: A lectotype for Cyathophora richardi Michelin 1843, Zootaxa, 3795(2), pages 198–200,

External links 	
 

Scleractinia genera
Prehistoric Hexacorallia genera
Stylinidae